The National Party of South West Africa was a political party in South West Africa.

History
The party was originally established in Mariental by Frikke Jooste in July 1924. It won two seats in the 1926 legislative elections, which saw the German League win eight of the twelve elected seats. On 31 January 1927 it merged with the South West Party, which had won one seat in the elections, to form the United National South West Party (UNSWP).

The National Party was re-established as a separate party in 1939, winning two seats in the 1940 elections, which saw the UNSWP win the remaining ten. It subsequently lost both seats in 1945, with the UNSWP winning all twelve. However, with its South African counterpart coming to power in 1948, the National Party also came to prominence in South West Africa, going on to win fifteen of the eighteen seats in the 1950 elections.

Thereafter the National Party dominated South West African politics, winning sixteen seats in the 1955 and 1961 elections and all eighteen in 1965. It subsequently won every seat in elections in 1970 and 1974.

A party congress in September 1977 saw a walkout of 80 moderate members led by Dirk Mudge, with Mudge forming the Republican Party on 5 October. Prior to the elections the following year, the National Party formed a multi-racial, Action Front for the Retention of Turnhalle Principles (ACTUR). However, it received only 12% of the vote, winning six seats to the Democratic Turnhalle Alliance's 41.

In 1980 a Second Tier Representative Authority was created for the white community. The National Party went on to dominate the body until its dissolution in 1989. It was part of the Action Christian National alliance alongside the German League for the 1989 elections, with the alliance winning three seats. In 1991 the party was disbanded, with party leader Kosie Pretorius forming the Monitor Action Group.

Leaders
1968–81: A.H. du Plessis
1981–91: Kosie Pretorius

Electoral history

Legislative Assembly elections

References 

National Party (South Africa)
Political parties with year of establishment missing
Political parties with year of disestablishment missing
20th century in South West Africa
Afrikaner nationalism
Conservative parties in Namibia
Defunct political parties in Namibia
Protestant political parties
South West Africa
20th century in Namibia
1924 establishments in South West Africa
1927 disestablishments in South West Africa
1939 establishments in South West Africa
1991 disestablishments in Namibia